Golden Hill, also known as Kam Shan, is a  tall mountain located in Hong Kong's New Territories.

Location 
Golden Hill is located inside Kam Shan Country Park.

Wildlife 

Golden Hill and surrounding areas are home to a large number of macaques. As a result, locals call this mountain "Monkey Hill".

See also 
 List of mountains, peaks and hills in Hong Kong

References 

Mountains, peaks and hills of Hong Kong